Do What You Want, also known as When love comes (original title: Hipólito y Evita), is a 1973 Argentine romantic comedy film directed by Orestes A. Trucco and starring Raúl Taibo, Amalia Scaliter, Gilda Lousek y Ricardo Bauleo. It was written by Salvador Valverde Calvo and shot in General Rodríguez.

Synopsis
A retelling on the Romeo and Juliet story, with the lovers' families at odds with each other over their different socio-political backgrounds. Hipolito's family is aristocratic and pro-Hipólito Yrigoyen, who was twice president of Argentina and co-founded the Radical Civic Union, a social liberal political party; while Evita comes from a working-class background and a family that supports Eva Perón and her husband Juan Perón, who was three times president and gave his name to the political movement known as Peronism, which in present-day Argentina is represented mainly by the Justicialist Party.

Cast

External links
 

1973 films
Argentine romantic comedy films
1970s Spanish-language films
1970s Argentine films